MLton is an open-source whole-program optimizing compiler for Standard ML. MLton development began in 1997, and continues with a worldwide community of developers and users, who have helped to port MLton to a number of platforms. MLton was a participating organization in the 2013 Google Summer of Code.

MLton aims to produce fast executables, and to encourage rapid prototyping and modular programming by eliminating inefficiencies often associated with high-level features. It also aims to facilitate large-scale programming through the MLBasis system, simplifying modularity and management of namespaces. As a whole-program compiler, it is notable for lacking an interactive top-level, common amongst Standard ML environments.

MLton includes several libraries in addition to the basis including ML Language Processing Tools with an implementation of ANTLR, and MLRISC with code generators for reduced instruction set CPUs. It also implements features that aid in porting code from SML/NJ, one of the more popular SML implementations, including support for SML/NJ's compilation manager.

See also

References

External links
 MLton webpage

ML programming language family